The French Cross Country Championships is the annual national championships for cross country running in France. The championships is generally held in late-February or early-March. Organised by the French Athletics Federation (FFA), it serves as a way of designating the country's national champion, as well as acting as the selection race for the IAAF World Cross Country Championships. First established in 1889, the competition has held over 125 editions. The women's race was first held in 1918.

The most successful athletes of the competition each have eight victories to their name: Driss El Himer in the men's section and Joëlle De Brouwer in the women's. Noël Tijou and Annette Sergent are the next most successful with seven wins.

Editions

Winners

Men

Long course

Short course

Women

Long course

Short course

References

Results
French Cross Country Championships. Association of Road Racing Statisticians. Retrieved 2019-06-17.

External links

 Site de la Fédération française d'athlétisme

Cross country running in France
Recurring events established in 1889
Cross
National cross country running competitions